In topology, a branch of mathematics, a retraction is a continuous mapping from a topological space into a subspace that preserves the position of all points in that subspace. The subspace is then called a retract of the original space. A deformation retraction is a mapping that captures the idea of continuously shrinking a space into a subspace.

An absolute neighborhood retract (ANR) is a particularly well-behaved type of topological space. For example, every topological manifold is an ANR. Every ANR has the homotopy type of a very simple topological space, a CW complex.

Definitions

Retract 
Let X be a topological space and A a subspace of X. Then a continuous map

is a retraction if the restriction of r to A is the identity map on A; that is,  for all a in A. Equivalently, denoting by

the inclusion, a retraction is a continuous map r such that

that is, the composition of r with the inclusion is the identity of A. Note that, by definition, a retraction maps X onto A. A subspace A is called a retract of X if such a retraction exists. For instance, any non-empty space retracts to a point in the obvious way (the constant map yields a retraction). If X is Hausdorff, then A must be a closed subset of X.

If  is a retraction, then the composition ι∘r is an idempotent continuous map from X to X. Conversely, given any idempotent continuous map  we obtain a retraction onto the image of s by restricting the codomain.

Deformation retract and strong deformation retract
A continuous map

is a deformation retraction of a space X onto a subspace A if, for every x in X and a in A,

In other words, a deformation retraction is a homotopy between a retraction and the identity map on X. The subspace A is called a deformation retract of X. A deformation retraction is a special case of a homotopy equivalence.

A retract need not be a deformation retract. For instance, having a single point as a deformation retract of a space X would imply that X is path connected (and in fact that X is contractible).

Note: An equivalent definition of deformation retraction is the following. A continuous map  is a deformation retraction if it is a retraction and its composition with the inclusion is homotopic to the identity map on X. In this formulation, a deformation retraction carries with it a homotopy between the identity map on X and itself.

If, in the definition of a deformation retraction, we add the requirement that

for all t in [0, 1] and a in A, then F is called a strong deformation retraction. In other words, a strong deformation retraction leaves points in A fixed throughout the homotopy. (Some authors, such as Hatcher, take this as the definition of deformation retraction.)

Cofibration and neighborhood deformation retract
A map f: A → X of topological spaces is a (Hurewicz) cofibration if it has the homotopy extension property for maps to any space. This is one of the central concepts of homotopy theory. A cofibration f is always injective, in fact a homeomorphism to its image. If X is Hausdorff (or a compactly generated weak Hausdorff space), then the image of a cofibration f is closed in X.

Among all closed inclusions, cofibrations can be characterized as follows.

For example, the inclusion of a subcomplex in a CW complex is a cofibration.

Properties
 One basic property of a retract A of X (with retraction ) is that every continuous map  has at least one extension  namely .
 Deformation retraction is a particular case of homotopy equivalence. In fact, two spaces are homotopy equivalent if and only if they are both homeomorphic to deformation retracts of a single larger space.
 Any topological space that deformation retracts to a point is contractible and vice versa. However, there exist contractible spaces that do not strongly deformation retract to a point.

No-retraction theorem
The boundary of the n-dimensional ball, that is, the (n−1)-sphere, is not a retract of the ball. (See .)

Absolute neighborhood retract (ANR)
A closed subset  of a topological space  is called a neighborhood retract of  if  is a retract of some open subset of  that contains .

Let  be a class of topological spaces, closed under homeomorphisms and passage to closed subsets.

Various classes  such as normal spaces have been considered in this definition, but the class  of metrizable spaces has been found to give the most satisfactory theory.

A metrizable space is an AR if and only if it is contractible and an ANR. By Dugundji, every locally convex metrizable topological vector space  is an AR; more generally, every nonempty convex subset of such a vector space  is an AR. For example, any normed vector space (complete or not) is an AR. More concretely, Euclidean space  the unit cube and the Hilbert cube  are ARs.

ANRs form a remarkable class of "well-behaved" topological spaces. Among their properties are:
Every open subset of an ANR is an ANR. 
By Hanner, a metrizable space that has an open cover by ANRs is an ANR. (That is, being an ANR is a local property for metrizable spaces.) It follows that every topological manifold is an ANR. For example, the sphere  is an ANR but not an AR (because it is not contractible). In infinite dimensions, Hanner's theorem implies that every Hilbert cube manifold as well as the (rather different, for example not locally compact) Hilbert manifolds and Banach manifolds are ANRs.
Every locally finite CW complex is an ANR. An arbitrary CW complex need not be metrizable, but every CW complex has the homotopy type of an ANR (which is metrizable, by definition).
A finite-dimensional metrizable space is an ANR if and only if it is locally contractible in this sense. For example, the Cantor set is a compact subset of the real line that is not an ANR, since it is not even locally connected.
Counterexamples: Borsuk found a compact subset of  that is an ANR but not strictly locally contractible. Borsuk also found a compact subset of the Hilbert cube that is locally contractible (as defined above) but not an ANR.
Every ANR has the homotopy type of a CW complex, by Whitehead and Milnor. Moreover, a locally compact ANR has the homotopy type of a locally finite CW complex; and, by West, a compact ANR has the homotopy type of a finite CW complex. In this sense, ANRs avoid all the homotopy-theoretic pathologies of arbitrary topological spaces. For example, the Whitehead theorem holds for ANRs: a map of ANRs that induces an isomorphism on homotopy groups (for all choices of base point) is a homotopy equivalence. Since ANRs include topological manifolds, Hilbert cube manifolds, Banach manifolds, and so on, these results apply to a large class of spaces.
Many mapping spaces are ANRs. In particular, let Y be an ANR with a closed subspace A that is an ANR, and let X be any compact metrizable space with a closed subspace B. Then the space  of maps of pairs  (with the compact-open topology on the mapping space) is an ANR. It follows, for example, that the loop space of any CW complex has the homotopy type of a CW complex.
By Cauty, a metrizable space  is an ANR if and only if every open subset of  has the homotopy type of a CW complex.
By Cauty, there is a metric linear space  (meaning a topological vector space with a translation-invariant metric) that is not an AR. One can take  to be separable and an F-space (that is, a complete metric linear space). (By Dugundji's theorem above,  cannot be locally convex.) Since  is contractible and not an AR, it is also not an ANR. By Cauty's theorem above,  has an open subset  that is not homotopy equivalent to a CW complex. Thus there is a metrizable space  that is strictly locally contractible but is not homotopy equivalent to a CW complex. It is not known whether a compact (or locally compact) metrizable space that is strictly locally contractible must be an ANR.

Notes

References

External links
 

Topology